Belle Chasse High School (BCHS) is a grade 9–12 senior high school in Belle Chasse, an unincorporated area in Plaquemines Parish, Louisiana, United States. It is a part of the Plaquemines Parish School Board.

The current school facility has multiple classroom buildings. It also houses one gymnasium, one cafeterias, an auditorium, an American football stadium, a band building, and a softball field.

History
The original school building, made of brick, opened in 1928. A wooden building was later built next to the brick one. The original brick building was renovated and renamed the "Gray Building" in 1958, and that year the current main building opened. The school crest was designed in the 1970s.

At first Belle Chasse High was K–12, but in 1977 Belle Chasse Middle School opened to take the middle grades away.

In 2009–2010, the school had 882 students, and this increased to 890 by 2010–2011.

Athletics
Belle Chasse High athletics competes in the LHSAA.

Championships
Football championships
(1) State Championship: 2008

Notable alumni
Bella Blue, burlesque dancer
Chris Henry, NFL player
James Wright, NFL player
Jeremy Vujnovich, NFL player

References

External links
 Belle Chasse High School
 Belle Chasse High School Cardinal Band

Public high schools in Louisiana
Schools in Plaquemines Parish, Louisiana